Point of Inquiry is the radio show and flagship podcast of the Center for Inquiry (CFI), "a think tank promoting science, reason, and secular values in public policy and at the grass roots". Started in 2005, Point of Inquiry has consistently been ranked among the best science podcasts available in iTunes. It has been celebrated for its guests and for the quality of its interviews. Former guests include leading scientists, writers and public intellectuals such as Neil DeGrasse Tyson, Paul Krugman, Lisa Randall, Brian Greene, Oliver Sacks, Susan Jacoby, David Brin and Temple Grandin.

Format

Point of Inquiry is recorded at the Center for Inquiry headquarters in Amherst, New York. iTunes features over 200 free episodes of Point of Inquiry, averaging 30 to 35 minutes in length, with each consisting of a long form interview with a high-profile guest from the worlds of scientific skepticism, science, academia, and philosophy. The show focuses on traditional topics in scientific skepticism, such as psychic investigations, alternative medicine, alleged extraterrestrial visitations, ghosts, and cryptozoology. It also covers current events and public policy. The inaugural episode in December 2005 featured an interview with CFI founder Paul Kurtz, who spoke about the incompatibility of science and religion.

In July 2012, Point of Inquiry produced their first video episode featuring Michael De Dora, Ed Brayton, Jessica Ahlquist, and Jamie Kilstein.

Previously, Chris Mooney hosted half of the shows with the balance split between the other hosts.

In October 2013, CFI announced the "new team who will take Point of Inquiry into its next exciting phase", Lindsay Beyerstein, Josh Zepps and producer Joshua Billingsley.

On June 2, 2017, Point of Inquiry released its first episode with new host Paul Fidalgo. New hosts Kavin Senapathy and James Underdown were announced on October 15, 2018. The show is produced by CFI digital marketing strategist, Michael Powell.

Staff

Timeline

Popular Science Idol
Point of inquiry co-sponsored the "Popular Science Idol" contest along with the National Science Foundation Office of Legislative and Public Affairs, Discover Magazine, and Popular Science as a science spoof of the reality television series American Idol. The event was hosted as a workshop to discover the next great science communicator. The event was hosted by Chris Mooney and Indre Viskontas served as one of the expert judges. The first event was won by Tom Di Loberto for a 3-minute presentation on the difficulties involved in predicting the weather.

Select episodes

A full episode list is available on iTunes.

Recognition
In May 2012, Point of Inquiry was named one of the "Top 10 Podcasts to Feed Your Brain" by Business Insider.

Featured podcast suggestion by the Telegraph February 9, 2013.

Awards

References

External links
 

Philosophy podcasts
Scientific skepticism mass media
Science podcasts
Alternative radio programs
American talk radio programs
Audio podcasts
2005 podcast debuts
2005 radio programme debuts